Elections to Durham County Council were held on in April 1955. The Labour party maintained their dominance, although their presence was reduced from 77 to 74 of the councils 88 councillors. 
All 29 Alderman remained Labour. Of the 74 Labour councillors returned, 48 were returned unopposed.

Aggregate results
This section summarises the detailed results which are noted in the following sections.

This table summarises the result of the elections in all wards. 88 councillors were elected. Councillors are listed first, then aldermen, meaning that "74 + 29" means 74 Councillors and 29 Aldermen.

Results by division

References

Notes

1955 English local elections
1955
20th century in County Durham